Sandali-ye Kanan (also Romanized as Şandalī-ye Kan‘ān; also known as Şandalī-ye Sheykh Kan‘ān) is a village in Howmeh-ye Gharbi Rural District, in the Central District of Ramhormoz County, Khuzestan Province, Iran. At the 2006 census, its population was 109, including 28 families.

References 

Populated places in Ramhormoz County